Niphargus hadzii is a species of crustacean in family Niphargidae. It is endemic to Slovenia, and is named after Slovene zoologist Jovan Hadži.

References

External links
 Niphargus Webpage - University of Ljubljana

Freshwater crustaceans of Europe
Niphargidae
Crustaceans described in 1956
Endemic fauna of Slovenia
Taxonomy articles created by Polbot